Olvi Leon Mangasarian (12 January 1934 – 15 March 2020) was the John von Neumann Professor Emeritus of Mathematics and Computer Sciences in Department of Mathematics, University of California, San Diego and Professor Emeritus of Computer Sciences at the University of Wisconsin-Madison and a recognised expert on optimization, data mining, and classification. In 2000, while  professor in the Computer Science Department of the University of Wisconsin–Madison, he was awarded the Frederick W. Lanchester Prize for pioneering work in introducing the use of Operations Research techniques to the field of data mining with a particularly notable application being to breast cancer diagnosis.

Selected publications
 Mangasarian, O. L. (1993). Nonlinear programming (Vol. 10). SIAM.

Festschrift
 Pang, J. S. (1999). Computational Optimization: A Tribute to Olvi Mangasarian, Volumes I and II. Kluwer Acad. Publ.

References

External links
personal homepage
Lanchester Prize announcement

American operations researchers
20th-century American mathematicians
21st-century American mathematicians
Harvard University alumni
University of California, San Diego faculty
University of Wisconsin–Madison faculty
Iraqi emigrants to the United States
1934 births
2020 deaths